Bondar (literally "cooper") is a Ukrainian folk dance of khorovod type (circle dance). Its pattern is based on imitation of the professional movements of the cooper.

References 

Ukrainian dances
Circle dances